The Lost Treasure of the Knights Templar is a 2006 Danish film based on books by the Danish author Erling Haagensen (see "The Templars' Secret Island").

References

External links
 http://www.merling.dk
 

2006 films
Danish children's films
Films with screenplays by Philip LaZebnik
Treasure hunt films
2000s Danish-language films